J44 may refer to:
 County Route J44 (California)
 Fairchild J44, a turbojet engine
 Gyroelongated triangular bicupola